Andrew Craig Robinson (born 10 March 1966) is an English former professional footballer who played as a midfielder. He made 70 appearances in the Football League playing for Burnley, Bury and Carlisle United, and also played non-league football for Wycombe Wanderers and Aylesbury United.

Honours
Wycombe Wanderers
FA Trophy: 1990–91

References

1966 births
Living people
English footballers
Footballers from Oldham
Association football midfielders
Manchester United F.C. players
Burnley F.C. players
Bury F.C. players
Carlisle United F.C. players
Wycombe Wanderers F.C. players
Aylesbury United F.C. players
English Football League players
National League (English football) players